Angelo Fioretti (30 March 1918 – 29 September 2001) was an Italian rower. He competed at the 1948 Summer Olympics in London with the men's eight where they were eliminated in the semi-final.

References

External links
 

1918 births
2001 deaths
Italian male rowers
Olympic rowers of Italy
Rowers at the 1948 Summer Olympics
Sportspeople from Varese
European Rowing Championships medalists